Pythia is a genus of small air-breathing salt marsh snails, pulmonate gastropod mollusks in the subfamily Pythiinae of the family Ellobiidae.

Pythia is a largely terrestrial genus commonly found in the Indo-Pacific. It lives in mangroves from above high tide to further inland. It is readily differentiated within the family by its dorso-ventrally flattened shell and heavily dentate aperture. Plate gave the first account of Pythia scarabaeus in 1897.

Pythia is the type genus of the subfamily Pythiinae.

Species
According to the World Register of Marine Species, species in the genus Pythia include:
 Pythia albovaricosa L. Pfeiffer, 1853
 Pythia anhi Thach, 2016
 Pythia apiensis E. A. Smith, 1884
 Pythia bischofi I. Rensch, 1937
 † Pythia bonneti (Cossmann, 1895) 
 Pythia borneensis (A. Adams, 1851)
 Pythia castanea (Lesson, 1831)
 Pythia cecillii (Philippi, 1847)
 Pythia celebensis L. Pfeiffer, 1855
 Pythia ceylanica L. Pfeiffer, 1853
 Pythia chalcostoma (A. Adams, 1851)
 Pythia chrysostoma Tapparone Canefri, 1883
 Pythia colmani Martins, 1995
 Pythia cumingiana (Petit de la Saussaye, 1843)
 Pythia fimbriosa Möllendorff, 1885
 Pythia imperforata (A. Adams, 1850)
 Pythia inflata L. Pfeiffer, 1853
 Pythia insularis (Hombron & Jacquinot, 1847)
 Pythia lekithostoma Reeve, 1832
 Pythia lozoueti Thach & F. Huber, 2021
 Pythia macgillivrayi L. Pfeiffer, 1855
 Pythia nana Bavay, 1908
 Pythia ovata L. Pfeiffer, 1855
 Pythia pantherina (A. Adams, 1851)
 Pythia perovata Garrett, 1872
 Pythia plicata (Férussac, 1821)
 Pythia pyramidata (Reeve, 1842)
 Pythia savaiensis (Mousson, 1869)
 Pythia scarabaeus (Linnaeus, 1758)
 Pythia semisulcata (A. Adams, 1851)
 Pythia sinuosa (A. Adams, 1851)
 Pythia striata (Reeve, 1842)
 Pythia tortuosa Mousson, 1871
 Pythia trigona (Troschel, 1838)
 Pythia undata (Lesson, 1831)
 Pythia variabilis (Hombron & Jacquinot, 1847)

Taxon inquirendum
 Pythia albovaricosa Pfeiffer, 1853 
 Pythia pachyodon Pilsbry & Y. Hirase, 1908 (taxon inquirendum)
Species brought into synonymy
 Pythia acuminata (Morelet, 1889): synonym of Myosotella myosotis (Draparnaud, 1801) (junior synonym)
 Pythia argenvillei L. Pfeiffer, 1853: synonym of Pythia scarabaeus (Linnaeus, 1758)
 Pythia cecillei (Philippi, 1847): synonym of Pythia cecillii (Philippi, 1847) (unjustified emendation to original species name, Scarabus cecillii Philippi, 1847)
 Pythia ferminii Beck, 1838: synonym of Ovatella firminii (Payraudeau, 1826)
 Pythia gassiesi Crosse, 1895: synonym of Pythia undata (Lesson, 1831) (junior subjective synonym)
 Pythia helicina Röding, 1798: synonym of Pythia scarabaeus (Linnaeus, 1758)
 Pythia letourneuxi (Bourguignat, 1887): synonym of Myosotella denticulata (Montagu, 1803): synonym of Myosotella myosotis (Draparnaud, 1801)
 Pythia petiveriana (Férussac, 1821): synonym of Pythia pantherina (A. Adams, 1851) (junior synonym)
Pythia reeveana Pfeiffer, 1853: synonym of Pythia pantherina (A. Adams, 1851) (junior synonym)

References

 Vaught, K.C. (1989). A classification of the living Mollusca. American Malacologists: Melbourne, FL (USA). . XII, 195 pp

External links
 Röding, P.F. (1798). Museum Boltenianum sive Catalogus cimeliorum e tribus regnis naturæ quæ olim collegerat Joa. Fried Bolten, M. D. p. d. per XL. annos proto physicus Hamburgensis. Pars secunda continens Conchylia sive Testacea univalvia, bivalvia & multivalvia. Trapp, Hamburg. viii, 199 pp
 Kobelt, W. (1897-1901). Die Familie Auriculacea. Zweiter Theil. In: Systematisches Conchylien-Cabinet von Martini und Chemnitz, Ersten Bandes, sechzehnte Abtheilung, zweiter Theil. (1) 16 (2, 433): pls. 10, 11, 13 (1897); (1) 16 (2, 435): 77-108, pls. 12, 14-18 (1898); (1) 16 (2, 437): 109-180, pls. 19-24 (1898); (1) 16 (2, 438): 181-228, pls. 25-30 (1898); (1) 16 (2, 458): 229-268, pls. 31, 32 (1900); (1) 16 (2, 460): 269-316 (1901). Nürnberg (Bauer & Raspe).
 Montfort P. [Denys de. (1808-1810). Conchyliologie systématique et classification méthodique des coquilles. Paris: Schoell. Vol. 1: pp. lxxxvii + 409]
 Möllendorff, O. F. von. (1898). Verzeichnis der auf den Philippinen lebenden Landmollusken. Abhandlungen der Naturforschenden Gesellschaft zu Görlitz. 22: 26-208.

Ellobiidae
Gastropod genera